Zabrus iconiensis is a species of ground beetle in the Pelor subgenus that is endemic to Turkey, where it can be found on a road between Konia and Kaisarie.

References

Beetles described in 1905
Beetles of Asia
Endemic fauna of Turkey
Zabrus